Daria "Dasha" Dmitrievna Nekrasova (born February 19, 1991) is a Belarusian-American actress, filmmaker, and host of the Red Scare podcast with Anna Khachiyan.

In 2018, she became known as "Sailor Socialism", after her interview with an InfoWars reporter, in which she was dressed in a sailor fuku, went viral. In 2021, she made her directorial debut with the horror film The Scary of Sixty-First, for which she won the Best First Feature Award at the Berlin International Film Festival, and appeared in a recurring role on the TV series Succession for which she won a Screen Actors Guild award, along with the cast.

Early life 
Nekrasova was born in Minsk, Belarus (at that time still part of USSR), to parents who worked as acrobats. She emigrated to the United States with her parents when she was four, settling in Las Vegas, Nevada.

She attended high school at Las Vegas Academy of the Arts, graduating in 2008, before attending Mills College, where she studied sociology and philosophy.

Career 
Nekrasova first appeared in music videos for alternative artists such as Yumi Zouma, before making her feature film debut in Wobble Palace, which she co-wrote with director Eugene Kotlyarenko. The New York Times described the film as "a sendup of broke-artist types that shimmers with abashed affection", while RogerEbert.com commented that "while your comedic milage with its loose goofiness may vary, this movie succeeds in contributing a filmic time capsule" for millennials. She appeared as the leading character in the dark comedy The Softness of Bodies, with The Hollywood Reporter saying she inhabited the role "effortlessly".

While promoting Wobble Palace at the 2018 South by Southwest Festival, her interview with right-wing media outlet InfoWars went viral. She was nicknamed "Sailor Socialism" for expressing her support for Bernie Sanders while dressed in a Japanese schoolgirl outfit resembling Sailor Moon. The clip was featured in a segment on Venezuela in an episode of Last Week Tonight with John Oliver.

On March 29, 2018, Nekrasova started the podcast Red Scare with co-host Anna Khachiyan. The show has been associated with the dirtbag left. It was described in The Cut as "a critique of feminism, and capitalism, from deep inside the culture they’ve spawned." Daily Dot said the show's "schtick" had been summed up by former congressional staffer Simone Norman, as "when hot mean girls become public leftists."

In February 2019, Nekrasova appeared – alongside Khachiyan – as a runway model at the Marlborough art gallery in Manhattan showcasing the Fall 2019 collection designed by Rachel Comey.
In 2020, Nekrasova made her directorial debut with The Scary of Sixty-First, a thriller co-written with Madeline Quinn, and inspired by the death of Jeffrey Epstein. The film premiered at the 71st Berlin International Film Festival and won the prize for Best First Feature. Later that year, Nekrasova co-wrote the short film, Spectacular Reality, inspired by conspiracies surrounding crisis actors and featuring models from No Agency New York, and directed the November 6, 2020 video performance of Oneohtrix Point Never's "I Don't Love Me Anymore" on The Tonight Show Starring Jimmy Fallon.

In November 2021, Nekrasova posted to Instagram a photo of herself with Alex Jones, the host of Infowars, and subsequently praised Jones on her podcast Red Scare as "an incredible entertainer".

Nekrasova appears in a supporting role in season three of the HBO drama Succession as Comfrey, a crisis PR rep.

Personal life

Nekrasova has dated Daniel Lopatin, better known as Oneohtrix Point Never, a musician. She is the former fiancée of comedian Adam Friedland, a host of the retired podcast Cum Town, and current host of The Adam Friedland Show.

Religious views 

Nekraskova is a self-described "Slovak Ruthenian Carpatho Rusyn Greek" Eastern Catholic. In a 2020 interview, Nekraskova stated:

Nekraskova is highly critical of Pope Francis, and has referred to him as a "layperson", "heretic", and "antipope". However, she has denied being a sedevacantist.

Filmography

Music videos

 "Don't Care" – Antwon, featuring Sad Andy (2014)
 "Basements" – Future Death (2014)
 "The Brae" – Yumi Zouma (2014)
 "A Long Walk Home for Parted Lovers" – Yumi Zouma (2014)
 "Prolog" – Tocotronic (2015)
 "Rebel Boy" – Tocotronic (2015)
 "I Don't Love You" – DJDS (2016)
 "Taking What's Not Yours" – TV Girl (2016)
 "Vinaigrette" – Gonjasufi (2016)

Awards and nominations

References

External links

1991 births
21st-century American actresses
21st-century Belarusian actresses
Actresses from Las Vegas
American film actresses
American podcasters
Belarusian emigrants to the United States
Belarusian film actresses
Living people
Mills College alumni
Actors from Minsk
American people of Belarusian descent
American women podcasters
American Eastern Catholics
Belarusian Eastern Catholics